Anu Kalm (born 15 January 1960) is an Estonian graphic artist and illustrator.

She graduated from Estonian State Art Institute (nowadays Estonian Academy of Arts) in printmaking and illustration.

She teaches at the Tallinn Art School.

She has illustrated over 20 children's books. Twice, she is listed in White Ravens catalogue.

She is married to an architecture historian Mart Kalm.

References

1960 births
Living people
Estonian women illustrators
20th-century Estonian women artists
21st-century Estonian women artists
Estonian children's book illustrators
People from Kuressaare